Karol Beck was the defender of title, but he preferred playing in the ATP 250 tournament in Newport instead.Rubén Ramírez Hidalgo won in the final against Roberto Bautista-Agut, 7–6(6), 6–4.

Seeds

Draw

Finals

Top half

Bottom half

References
Main Draw
Qualifying Singles

Singles
2010